Lybaert is a Dutch-language surname. Notable people with the surname include:

Marijn Lybaert, a Belgian professional Magic: The Gathering player
Théophile Lybaert, (14 June 1848 – 1927), a Belgian painter and sculptor

Surnames of Belgian origin
Dutch-language surnames